The Order of Nishanizzuddeen is the highest honor given to foreign nationals by the Maldives government. They are seven recipients so far who has been awarded the honor.

List of recipients 
Prince Philip, Duke of Edinburgh, 13 March 1972 
Prime Minister Narendra Modi of India. June 8,2019

References

Orders, decorations, and medals of the Maldives